Cnemaspis krishnagiriensis, the Krishnagiri dwarf gecko, is a species of diurnal, rock-dwelling, insectivorous gecko endemic to  India. It is distributed in Tamil Nadu.

References

 Cnemaspis krishnagiriensis

krishnagiriensis
Reptiles of India
Reptiles described in 2021
Taxa named by Ishan Agarwal
Taxa named by Akshay Khandekar